The 2021 Call of Duty League season was the second season for the Call of Duty League, an esports league based on the video game franchise Call of Duty.

Teams

Regular season

Format 
For the 2021 season, the twelve teams are evenly split into two groups of six teams each. The season consists of five stages, with teams playing group play matches over the course of three weeks to determine seeding for that stage's Major. For Stage 1, the finalists of 2020 season Dallas Empire and Atlanta FaZe got to pick which teams plays in which group, with Dallas Empire first getting to pick a team for the group of Atlanta FaZe, followed by Atlanta FaZe picking a team for the group of Dallas Empire. The team which was picked by Dallas Empire for the group of Atlanta FaZe then got to pick a team for the group of Dallas Empire, with this process continuing until both groups consist of 6 teams. The six teams in each group will then play each other over the course of three weeks to determine seeding, with teams being awarded 10 CDL Points for each victory. At each Major, teams are awarded CDL Points based on their final standings; 75 CDL Points for 1st place, 60 CDL Points for 2nd place, 50 CDL Points for 3rd place, 40 CDL Points for 4th place, 30 CDL Points for 5th/6th place, 20 CDL Points for 7th/8th place, 10 CDL Points for 9th/10th place and no CDL Points for 11th/12th place. For Stage 2, the top two teams from the Stage 1 Major will have the first two picks for the Stage 2 groups, repeating the same process before Stage 1 kicked off.

Prize pool distribution 
The prize pool distribution has changed heavily since the 2020 season. This is due to the increase of the prize pool as well as all 12 teams qualifying for each major tournament. There is $500,000 for each major event and $2,500,000 for the playoffs making a total of about $5,000,000 for the whole season in prizes.

Majors:

 1st Place = $200,000
 2nd Place = $120,000
 3rd Place = $80,000
 4th Place = $40,000
 5th/6th Place = $20,000 per team
 7th/8th Place = $10,000 per team
 9th-12th Place = $0

Playoffs:

 1st Place = $1,200,000
 2nd Place = $650,000
 3rd Place = $300,000
 4th Place = $150,000
 5th/6th Place = $75,000 per team
 7th/8th Place = $25,000 per team
 9th-12th Place = $0

Standings

Stage 1 
Stage 1 group stages began on February 11, 2021, and ended on February 28.

Group A

Group B

Source:

Major
The Stage 1 Major ran from March 3 to March 7, 2021. Atlanta FaZe won the Major, with the Dallas Empire as the runners-up.

Stage 2 
Stage 2 group stages began on March 18, 2021, and ended on April 4. Starting with Stage 2, Crossroads Hardpoint and Garrison Search & Destroy were removed from the list of maps being played, with Apocalypse Hardpoint and Express Search & Destroy being added.

Group A

Group B

Source:

Major
The Stage 2 Major ran from April 7 to April 11, 2021. Toronto Ultra won the Major, with the Atlanta FaZe as the runners-up.

Stage 3 
Stage 3 group stages began on April 22, 2021, and ended on May 9. Matches were played on Thursday through Sunday.

Group A

Group B

Source

Major
The Stage 3 Major ran from May 13 until May 16, 2021. Atlanta FaZe won their second Major of the season, with the New York Subliners as the runners-up.

Stage 4 
Atlanta FaZe won the Major, while Dallas Empire finished as Runners Up.Stage 4 group stages began on May 27, 2021, and ended on June 13. Matches were played on Thursday through Sunday. Starting with Stage 4, Checkmate Search & Destroy was removed from the list of maps being played, with Standoff Search & Destroy being added.

Group A

Group B

Source

Major
The Stage 4 Major ran from June 17 to June 20, 2021. For the first time since March 2020 the league moved back to playing on LAN. Atlanta FaZe won their third Major of the season, with the Dallas Empire as the runners-up.

Stage 5 
Stage 5 group stages began on July 8, 2021, and will end on July 25. Matches are played on Thursday through Sunday.

Group A

Group B

Source

Major
The Stage 5 Major ran from July 29 to August 1, 2021. Minnesota ROKKR won their first Major of the season after being down 0–4 in the finals, making it the greatest comeback in Call of Duty history, with the Toronto Ultra as the runners-up.

Championship Weekend 
The Championship Weekend began on August 19 and will conclude on August 22, 2021. The top eight teams compete in the Championship Weekend, and all matches will be played in Los Angeles.

Bracket

Grand finals

References

External links
 

Call of Duty League seasons
Call of Duty